Hasanpura is a village in Ghazipur District of Uttar Pradesh, India.

References

Villages in Ghazipur district